Katrina Holden Bronson is an American film director, screenwriter and actress. She is the adopted daughter of actors Charles Bronson and Jill Ireland.

Bronson's work as director includes Daltry Calhoun (2005).

Filmography
 The Uncanny (1977) as Lucy
 Death Wish 4: The Crackdown (1987) as Nurse
 Last Exit to Earth (1996) as Woman #1
 Defying Gravity (1997) as Rachel
 Winding Roads (1999) as Samantha Stafford
 Bleach (2002) as Laura
 Spanish Fly (2003) as Anda
 Daltry Calhoun (2005) as writer and director

References

External links
 

American film directors
American women film directors
Living people
20th-century American actresses
21st-century American actresses
Place of birth missing (living people)
Year of birth missing (living people)